WTMP-FM (96.1 MHz "La Invasora 96") is a commercial FM radio station licensed to Dade City, Florida. The station is owned by Vallejo Production. WTMP-FM airs a Spanish-language Regional Mexican radio format. WTMP-FM is the Spanish-language flagship station for the Tampa Bay Buccaneers Spanish Radio Network.

WTMP-FM's studios are on 5207 E Washington St in Tampa. Its transmitter is off Spike Road near Spring Lake Highway in Spring Lake, Florida. WTMP-FM is a Class A station, with an effective radiated power (ERP) of 2,800 watts, while several Tampa Bay stations operate at 100,000 watts. This makes WTMP-FM limited in its coverage area to the northern suburbs in the Tampa Bay area.

History
The station first signed on the air on September 3, 1993 as WBSB. It was owned by Dade City Broadcasting, Inc. and aired an adult contemporary music format.

In 2001, the station was acquired by Tama Broadcasting, Inc. for $4.1 million. Tama already owned AM 1150 WTMP, an urban adult contemporary station. Tama put the same format on 96.1, switching the call sign to WTMP-FM.

In 2018, NIA Broadcasting bought WTMP-FM for $350,000. NIA, owned by Neal Ardman, began simulcasting the Regional Mexican format heard on AM 1470 WMGG on 96.1 WTMP-FM, calling the stations "La Mexicana 96.1 and 1470", but later switched the moniker to "Caliente 96.1 and 1470".  It has since split from the simulcast of WMGG.It been rebranded as "La Invasora 96".

References

External links
Official WTMP-FM Website

TMP-FM
Radio stations established in 1994
1994 establishments in Florida
Regional Mexican radio stations in the United States
TMP-FM